The 1967 Nippon Professional Baseball season was the 18th season of operation of Nippon Professional Baseball (NPB).

Regular season

Standings

League leaders

Central League

Pacific League

Awards
Most Valuable Player
Sadaharu Oh, Yomiuri Giants (CL)
Mitsuhiro Adachi, Hankyu Braves (PL)
Rookie of the Year
Shiro Takegami, Sankei Atoms (CL)
Yoshimasa Takahashi, Toei Flyers (PL)
Eiji Sawamura Award
Kentaro Ogawa, Chunichi Dragons (CL)

See also
1967 Major League Baseball season

References